Macrocerus is a European genus of soldier beetles in the subfamily Malthininae and sometimes placed in the monotypic tribe Malchinini.

Species 
BioLib lists the following species:
 Macrocerus carinicollis (Weise, 1895)
 Macrocerus holomelas (Fairmaire, 1886)
 Macrocerus kadleci (Svihla, 2002)
 Macrocerus nigrinus (Schaufuss, 1866)
 Macrocerus oculatus (Motschulsky, 1845)
 Macrocerus sinuatocollis (Kiesenwetter, 1852)
 †Macrocerus sucinopenninus (Kuśka & Kania, 2010) (Rupelian age)
 Macrocerus tunicatus (Kiesenwetter, 1863)

References

External links
 

Cantharidae
Elateroidea genera
Beetles of Europe